Peter W. Breene was the fourth Lieutenant Governor of Colorado. He was a Republican and served from 1885 to 1887 under Governor Benjamin Harrison Eaton.

Breene was born in August, 1846 in Kilkenny, Leinster, Ireland. He immigrated to Indiana and became a miner. He moved to Leadville, Colorado in 1877 and amassed a fortune in mining. He became an organizer and leader among the miners. He served in the Colorado House of Representatives (1883–1885), as lieutenant governor from 1885 to 1887, and as the Colorado State Treasurer from 1887 to 1889. He died December 24, 1926, in Leadville.

References

Lieutenant Governors of Colorado
State treasurers of Colorado
American miners
1846 births
1926 deaths
People from Leadville, Colorado
Irish emigrants to the United States (before 1923)
Politicians from County Kilkenny
Colorado Republicans